Rui Pedro Rodrigues Eugénio (born 21 July 1966) is a Portuguese former professional footballer who played as a right or left-back.

Club career
Born in Almada, Setúbal District, Eugénio played at the professional level with S.C. Olhanense, R.D. Águeda, G.D. Estoril Praia, S.C. Farense (two spells) and S.C. Braga. He amassed Primeira Liga totals of 272 games and five goals over the course of 11 seasons, in representation of the fourth and fifth clubs.

After retiring, Eugénio stayed connected with Farense as an assistant manager.

Personal life
Eugénio's son, Pedro, was also a footballer and a defender.

References

External links

1966 births
Living people
Sportspeople from Almada
Portuguese footballers
Association football defenders
Primeira Liga players
Liga Portugal 2 players
Segunda Divisão players
S.C. Olhanense players
G.D. Estoril Praia players
S.C. Farense players
S.C. Braga players
Portugal youth international footballers